Jensenia spinosa is a dioicous bryophyte plant in the liverwort family Pallaviciniaceae. It is the only African member of the genus Jensenia, and generally occurs at high elevations. It is widespread but scarce, and has been found in South Africa, Malawi, Tanzania, Rwanda (Volcanoes National Park at 3,650m), the Democratic Republic of the Congo, as well as the islands of Mauritius, Réunion and Saint Helena.

Jensenia spinosa is very similar to its neotropical relative J. erythropus, though geographically isolated. Both may be confused with Symphyogyna species, but the latter's scale-shaped, rather than cup-shaped involucres have been useful in distinguishing the two genera.

References 

Pallaviciniales
Plants described in 1847
Flora of the Democratic Republic of the Congo
Flora of Malawi
Flora of Mauritius
Flora of Réunion
Flora of Rwanda
Flora of Saint Helena
Flora of South Africa
Flora of Tanzania
Taxa named by Carl Moritz Gottsche